Veiloor  is a village in Thiruvananthapuram district in the state of Kerala, India.

Demographics
 India census, Veiloor had a population of 21369 with 10009 males and 11360 females.

References

Villages in Thiruvananthapuram district